Halocynthia is a genus of ascidian tunicates in the family Pyuridae. Species such as H. roretzi are used as food.

Species within the genus Halocynthia include:
 Halocynthia aurantium (Pallas, 1787) 
 Halocynthia breviramosa Sluiter, 1904 
 Halocynthia cactus (Oka, 1932) 
 Halocynthia dumosa (Stimpson, 1855) 
 Halocynthia hilgendorfi (Traustedt, 1885) 
 Halocynthia igaboja Oka, 1906 
 Halocynthia igaguri Tokioka, 1953 
 Halocynthia microspinosa (Van Name, 1921) 
 Halocynthia okai Ritter, 1907 
 Halocynthia papillosa (Linnaeus, 1767) 
 Halocynthia pyriformis (Rathke, 1806) 
 Halocynthia roretzi (Drasche, 1884) 
 Halocynthia simaensis Tokioka, 1949 
 Halocynthia spinosa Sluiter, 1905 
 Halocynthia turboga (Oka, 1929)

Species names currently considered to be synonyms:
 Halocynthia arabica Monniot, 1965: synonym of Halocynthia spinosa Sluiter, 1905 
 Halocynthia arctica (Hartmeyer, 1899): synonym of Boltenia echinata (Linnaeus, 1767) 
 Halocynthia carnleyensis Bovien, 1921: synonym of Pyura trita (Sluiter, 1900) 
 Halocynthia castaneiformis (Drasche, 1884): synonym of Boltenia villosa (Stimpson, 1864) 
 Halocynthia cerebriformis (Herdman, 1881): synonym of Pyura spinosa (Quoy & Gaimard, 1834) 
 Halocynthia chilensis (Molina, 1782): synonym of Pyura chilensis Molina, 1782 
 Halocynthia comma Hartmeyer, 1906: synonym of Pyura comma (Hartmeyer, 1906) 
 Halocynthia deani (Ritter, 1900): synonym of Halocynthia aurantium (Pallas, 1787) 
 Halocynthia defectiva Millar, 1962: synonym of Halocynthia spinosa Sluiter, 1905 
 Halocynthia discoveryi Herdman, 1910: synonym of Pyura discoveryi (Herdman, 1910) 
 Halocynthia echinata (Linnaeus, 1767): synonym of Boltenia echinata (Linnaeus, 1767) 
 Halocynthia gangelion (Savigny, 1816): synonym of Pyura gangelion (Savigny, 1816) 
 Halocynthia grandis (Heller, 1878): synonym of Herdmania grandis (Heller, 1878) 
 Halocynthia haustor (Stimpson, 1864): synonym of Pyura haustor (Stimpson, 1864) 
 Halocynthia hispida (Herdman, 1881): synonym of Halocynthia dumosa (Stimpson, 1855) 
 Halocynthia hystrix Oka, 1930: synonym of Pyura sacciformis (Drasche, 1884) 
 Halocynthia jacatrensis (Sluiter, 1890): synonym of Pyura arenosa (Herdman, 1882) 
 Halocynthia jakoboja Oka, 1906: synonym of Halocynthia igaboja Oka, 1906 
 Halocynthia johnsoni Ritter, 1909: synonym of Pyura haustor (Stimpson, 1864) 
 Halocynthia jokoboja Oka, 1906: synonym of Pyura sacciformis (Drasche, 1884) 
 Halocynthia karasboja Oka, 1906: synonym of Pyura vittata (Stimpson, 1852) 
 Halocynthia michaelseni Oka, 1906: synonym of Pyura sacciformis (Drasche, 1884) 
 Halocynthia mirabilis (Drasche, 1884): synonym of Herdmania mirabilis (Drasche, 1884) 
 Halocynthia momus (Savigny, 1816): synonym of Herdmania momus (Savigny, 1816) 
 Halocynthia owstoni Oka, 1906: synonym of Halocynthia igaboja Oka, 1906 
 Halocynthia paessleri (Michaelsen, 1900): synonym of Pyura paessleri (Michaelsen, 1900) 
 Halocynthia pallida (Heller, 1878): synonym of Herdmania pallida (Heller, 1878) 
 Halocynthia partita (Stimpson, 1852): synonym of Styela canopus (Savigny, 1816) 
 Halocynthia polycarpa Sluiter, 1904: synonym of Pyura polycarpa (Sluiter, 1904) 
 Halocynthia pulchella (Verrill, 1871): synonym of Dendrodoa pulchella (Rathke, 1806) 
 Halocynthia riiseana (Traustedt, 1883): synonym of Pyura vittata (Stimpson, 1852) 
 Halocynthia ritteri (Oka, 1906): synonym of Halocynthia igaboja Oka, 1906 
 Halocynthia rustica (Linnaeus, 1767): synonym of Styela rustica Linnaeus, 1767 
 Halocynthia sanderi (Traustedt & Weltner, 1894): synonym of Pyura sacciformis (Drasche, 1884) 
 Halocynthia setosa Sluiter, 1905: synonym of Pyura setosa (Sluiter, 1905) 
 Halocynthia stubenrauchi (Michaelsen, 1900): synonym of Pyura stubenrauchi (Michaelsen, 1900) 
 Halocynthia superba (Ritter, 1900): synonym of Halocynthia aurantium (Pallas, 1787) 
 Halocynthia transversaria Sluiter, 1904: synonym of Boltenia transversaria (Sluiter, 1904) 
 Halocynthia tuberculum Verrill, 1879: synonym of Styela coriacea (Alder & Hancock, 1848) 
 Halocynthia vanhaffeni Michaelsen, 1904: synonym of Pyura stolonifera (Heller, 1878) 
 Halocynthia vanhoeffeni Michaelsen, 1904: synonym of Pyura stolonifera (Heller, 1878) 
 Halocynthia vanhoffeni Michaelsen, 1904: synonym of Pyura stolonifera (Heller, 1878) 
 Halocynthia villosa (Stimpson, 1864): synonym of Boltenia villosa (Stimpson, 1864) 
 Halocynthia washingtonia Ritter, 1913: synonym of Pyura haustor (Stimpson, 1864)

References

External links
 Tunicate genus link- contains genus Halocynthia information

Stolidobranchia
Tunicate genera

ja:ホヤ